K XIV was one of five s built for the Royal Netherlands Navy. She served during World War II.

Service history
The submarine was laid down in Rotterdam at the shipyard of Rotterdamsche Droogdok Maatschappij on 31 May 1930. The launch took place on 11 July 1931.
On 6 July 1933 the boat was commissioned in the Dutch navy.

On 7 February 1934 K XIV and  left the Netherlands for the Dutch East Indies. The route they took led through the Suez Canal.
On 6 September 1938 she took part in a fleet show at Surabaya. The show was held in honour of the Dutch Queen Wilhelmina of the Netherlands who celebrating her 40th year as head of state. More than 20 navy ships participated in the show.

During the Second World War K XIV attacked a Japanese invasion convoy that was landing troops on 23 December 1941, at the mouth of the Santubong River in western Sarawak.
The convoy reached the river mouth about 1800 hrs and started to put troops ashore. At either 2040 hrs or 2240 hrs (sources differ), K XIV torpedoed four ships. Katori Maru and another troop ship, Hiyoshi Maru (also called Hie Maru), were sunk at position  and the transport ships  and another ship, either  or Nichiran Maru, were damaged. Hokkai Maru was so heavily damaged that she was grounded to avoid sinking, but was later refloated and repaired.

The Japanese made six depth charge attacks, dropping about 25 depth charges, but K XIV survived and escaped via the Sunda Strait to Colombo, Ceylon. 

K XIV survived the war and was decommissioned on 23 April 1946. On 1 June 1946 she was stricken.

Summary of raiding history
Ships sunk and damaged by K XIV.

References

1931 ships
Ships built in Rotterdam
K XIV-class submarines
Submarines built by Rotterdamsche Droogdok Maatschappij